I Dreamt I Woke Up is a 1991 Irish short film directed by John Boorman. It stars John Hurt and Janet McTeer as well as Boorman and his son Charley. Commissioned by the BBC as part of "The Director's Place" series, the essay/documentary explores the home and neighbours of John Boorman and the mystical qualities of the Wicklow Mountains as well as their influence on some of Boorman's films, namely "Excalibur", "Deliverance" and "Hope And Glory".

The director discussed the film in "Projections 1", an anthology about filmmakers he edited, and included the complete shooting script of "I Dreamt I Woke Up". The origin and genesis of the project is described in detail in Brian Hoyle's book about the director.

References

External links
 

1991 films
Irish short documentary films
Films set in Ireland
English-language Irish films
Films directed by John Boorman
1990s short documentary films
1990s English-language films